The Kumudini or Kumuthini boat massacre (Tamil:குமுதினி படகுப் படுகொலைகள்) happened on 15 May 1985 when at least 23 minority Sri Lankan Tamil men, women and children on a ferry boat named Kumudini sailing from the island of Delft to the island of Nainathivu were killed by Sri Lankan Navy personnel.

According to eyewitness accounts six men believed to be from the Sri Lanka navy, dressed in T-shirts and blue longs and some in shorts, boarded the ferry boat. One by one the passengers were called to the aft section of the boat and told to shout their name, age, address and the destination of their journey. Then they were hacked to death. 

The incident was sparked by the Anuradhapura massacre, where 146 Sinhalese civilians were gunned down by the LTTE, in revenge for the 1985 Valvettiturai massacre. In the ensuing weeks dozens more Tamil civilians were also killed.

The incident 
Eyewitness accounts were documented by Amnesty International. The government owned ferry boat known as a launch in the local Sri Lankan Tamil dialect named Kumudini (also Kumuthini) plying between number of islets in the Northern province was boarded with passengers at about 7.45 a.m. on May 15, 1985. After it had moved from the island of Delft towards the island of Nainativu, it was ordered stopped by some men who came in a fiber glass boat. About six men boarded Kumudini while about two remained in the fiber glass boat which they tied on to Kumudini. The men who boarded Kumudini had rifles and all of them were dressed variously in blue pants or shorts and T-shirts as worn by the Sri Lankan navy personnel.

All the passengers and crew were ordered to enter the forepart of the boat and ordered below deck. All the passengers were also made to shout out their names, status, locality and where bound to and then they were ordered to come out one at a time. One man pointing out a gun shouted out such an orders in broken Tamil. The eyewitness or the others in the fore section did not know what was happening to each person who was led away in this manner owing to the noise created by the forced shouting of passengers.

When the eyewitness approached the upper deck, he saw blood all over and the cut pieces of human bodies. At this juncture the eyewitness shouted and refused to move. 

About 45 minutes after the attack on the eyewitness the fiberglass boat left the ferry boat.

Villagers in 2007 reported to local Human Rights groups such as UTHR that special knives used by local toddy tappers to tap toddy was collected and used by the perpetrators to kill the passengers.

Casualties
 Although various estimates put the death toll anywhere from 36 to 48, Amnesty International has names of only 23 persons killed in this incident.

Reactions

Amnesty International
Amnesty International identified and recorded the eyewitness accounts of the survivors and wrote a detailed report to the government asking it to take appropriate action against the perpetrators.

Sri Lankan government
When it was alleged that navy personnel from the Nainathievu island naval base were responsible for the killings, Lalith Athulathmudali, the then Minister for National Security, reportedly stated,

LTTE
The rebel group LTTE’s peace secretariat released a statement on November 22, 2006 that alleges that of the 72 people on board the ferry, about 36 were killed and the rest survived. It also documents the statements of more survivors.

References

External links
Kumuthini boat massacre remembrance
Kumuthini boat massacre:A pictorial
Kumudini boat massacre pictures 

1985 crimes in Sri Lanka
Attacks on civilians attributed to the Sri Lanka Navy
Axe murder
Massacres in Sri Lanka
Maritime incidents in 1985
Massacres in 1985
Mass murder of Sri Lankan Tamils
Sri Lankan government forces attacks in Eelam War I
Neduntheevu
Terrorist incidents in Sri Lanka in 1985